Yeates is a surname. Notable people with the surname include:
 David Yeates, Irish musician
 Gregor W. Yeates (1944–2012), New Zealand nematologist
 J. Lanier Yeates (born 1945), American writer
 Jasper Yeates (1745–1817), American lawyer and judge
 Jeff Yeates (born 1951), American football player 
 Jesse Johnson Yeates (1829–1892), American politician 
 Joanna Yeates (1985–2010), English landscape architect who was murdered
 John Yeates (born 1938), Australian football player
 John Stuart Yeates (1900–1986), New Zealand botanist
 Mark Yeates (born 1985), Irish football player
 Mark Yeates (Australian rules footballer) (born 1960)
 Martin Yeates (born 1953), English motorcycle racer
 Thomas Yeates (born 1955), American comics artist
 Thomas Yeates (orientalist) (1768–1869), English linguist
 Victor Maslin Yeates (1897–1934), English fighter pilot and writer
 Victoria Yeates (born 1983), English actress

See also

 Houston Brookshire–Yeates House, Lufkin, Texas, U.S.; an NRHP-listed house
 Jasper Yeates House, Lancaster, Lancaster County, Pennsylvania, U.S.; an NRHP-listed house
Mark Yeates (disambiguation)
 Myrick–Yeates–Vaughan House, Murfreesboro, Hertford County, North Carolina, U.S.; an NRHP-listed house 
Yates (disambiguation)
Yeate, South Gloucestershire, England, UK
Yeats (disambiguation)